The Unseen Stream is a progressive classical album by Troy Donockley. This was his first solo outing and was released in 1998.

This recording shows Troy as a multi-skilled wood player. His main instrument is the Uilleann Pipes adding also Low Whistles, Electric and Acoustic Guitars, Keys, Cittern and Mandolin, and he has composed most of the tracks. Although a solo recording he includes guests Irish fiddler Nollaig Casey, piano player Neil Drinkwater, his Iona colleagues Joanne Hogg (voice), Terl Bryant (percussion) and Tim Harries (bass), the Emperor String Quartet and Duncan Rayson on the Rochdale Town Hall Organ. The piece draws on Irish Orchestral works, folk, rock, jazz, Scandinavian symphonies and New Age stylistically. The music is mostly expressions of Troy's experience, particularly inspired by natural beauty of the coast.

Personnel

Musicians in order of appearance
Troy Donockley - Uillean Pipes, Low Whistles, Electric and Acoustic Guitars, Keys, Cittern and Mandolin, Tin Whistles, Vocals
Terl Bryant - Percussion (Cymbals, Gong, Bodhrans, Bells, Various Drums)
Duncan Rayson - Organ
Nollaig Casey - Fiddle
Chris Redgate - Oboe
Emperor String Quartet - Strings
Martin Burgess - Violin
Claire Hayes - Violin
Fiona Bonds - Viola
William Schofield - Cello
Neil Drinkwater - Grand Piano
Tim Harries - Bass
Joanne Hogg - Vocals
Nick Holland - Voice
Julie Darling - Harp
Andy Duncan - Percussion (Djembe, Darabuka), Voices

Additional credits
 Produced by Troy Donockley and Nigel Palmer
 Recorded at Gemini Studios, Ipswich; Warterworld, Yorkshire; Chapel Studios, Lincolnshire; Cannibal Studios, Dublin
 Engineered by Nigel Palmer
 Organ recorded on location at Rochdale Town Hall
 Design and Photography by Chris Sands
 Troy Photograph by Jonathan Mark
 Remastered by Denis Blackham at Skye Masters 2005
 Music composed and arranged by Troy Donockley except "Air" (traditional; arranged by Troy Donockley) and "Finlandia" (Sibelius; arranged by Troy Donockley)

Track listing
"Wild Black Coast" - 3:23
"Sights" - 3:10
"Air" - 5:00
"Yearl" - 14:14
"Carousel" - 4:55
"Tunnels" - 9:52
"Finlandia" - 3:45
"Death of Rainbows" - 3:16

Total time - 47:41

Release Details
1998, UK, Alliance Records 1901162, Release Date 10 August 1998, CD
2005, UK, Lantern Music and SGO Music Publishing Ltd. LNTNCD2, Remastered, CD

Troy Donockley albums
1998 debut albums